Hödekin (also spelled Hödeken, Hüdekin, and Hütchen) is a kobold (house spirit) of German folklore. According to the legend recorded by folklorist Thomas Keightley in 1850, Hödekin always wore a felt hat down over his face;  his name means "Little Hat". Hödekin lived with the  Bishop of Hildesheim and was a helpful sprite.

He kept the watch awake at night, and he warned the bishop and others about problems in the future. One inhabitant of Hildesheim asked Hödekin to guard his wife while he was away. "My good fellow, just keep an eye on my wife while I am away, and see that all goes on right." When the wife was visited by several paramours Hödekin leapt between them and assumed terrible shapes, or threw them to the floor to scare them away before the wife could be unfaithful. When the husband returned, Hödekin complained, Your return is most grateful to me, that I may escape the trouble and disquiet that you had imposed upon me. . . . To gratify you I have guarded [your wife] this time, and kept her from adultery, though with great and incessant toil. But I beg of you never more to commit her to my keeping; for I would sooner take charge of, and be accountable for, all the swine in Saxony than for one such woman, so many were the artifices and plots she devised to blink me.

Hödekin was easily angered. A kitchen servant often threw dirt and unclean water on him. Hödekin asked the head cook to chastise the boy, but the cook chided the kobold for fearing a child. The sprite replied, "Since you won't punish the boy, I will, in a few days, let you see how much afraid of him I am." When the boy went to sleep, Hödekin strangled him, cut him to pieces, and put his flesh in a pot over the fire. The cook rebuked the kobold for this behaviour, which prompted Hödekin to squeeze toads over the bishop's meat and punt the cook into the castle moat. The incident prompted the bishop to exorcise the kobold from the premises.

In the 1803 novel Der Zwerg by Goethe's brother-in-law Christian August Vulpius, a dwarf called "Hüttchen" pretends to be a helpful sprite but eventually turns out to be the Devil.

A connection between Hödekin and Friar Rush, a rascally devil in the guise of a friar, who murderously subverts the abbot's household while seeming to make himself useful in the kitchen and with chores, was suggested by the Shakespeare scholar George Lyman Kittredge, who noted the connection has been made in Reginald Scott's Discoverie of Witchcraft, 1584.

Sir Sidney Lee (1859–1926), editing the entry for Robin Hood in the DNB suggested that the name Robin Hood originally belonged to a forest-elf, and that "in its origin the name was probably a variant of 'Hodekin',  the title of a sprite or elf in Teutonic folk-lore". He took his cue from the scholarly tradition, expressed by T. Crofton Croker in 1833, that Hood, "the title assumed by, or applied to the famous outlaw, was no other than one which had been appropriated to a denizen of fairy land — Hudikin or Hodekin, that is little hood, or cowl, being a Dutch or German spirit, so called from the most remarkable part of his dress, in which also the Norwegian Nis and Spanish Duende were believed to appear." Croker's and Lee's proposed connection with the woodland sprite Robin Goodfellow, in the absence of traces of magic in the Robin Hood ballads, has not been taken up by modern scholars.

Notes

References
 Arrowsmith, N. Morse G. (1977). A Field Guide to the Little People. London: Pan Macmillan. .
 Hölling, Johann Conrad Stephan (1730). Einleitung zur Weltlichen, Kirchen = und Reformations=Historie Des Hoch=Stiffts Hildesheim, Durch besondere Erörterungen solcher Begebenheiten in der Grafschafft Wintzenburg, und der darin belegenen Stadt Alfeld. Hildesheim:Ludolph Schröder (Contains a large number of very old reports about Hödecken.). 
 Keightley, Thomas (1850). The Fairy Mythology, Illustrative of the Romance and Superstition of Various Countries. London: H. G. Bohn.

Kobolds
German folklore
Household deities